Blanding Municipal Airport  is a city-owned public-use airport located three nautical miles (6 km) south of the central business district of Blanding, a city in San Juan County, Utah, United States.

History 
Blanding saw commuter airline service with direct flights to Moab and Salt Lake City, Utah by at least three carriers from the 1970s through the 1990s:

Sun Valley Key Commuter flew Piper Navajo's in 1976.

Transwestern Airlines flew Aero Commander's and single engine Cessna aircraft from 1977 through 1980.

Alpine Air then provided service in 1984 and 1985. After that, on-demand charter service was provided by Scenic Aviation in connection with Alpine Air into the 1990s for service to Moab and connecting flights to Salt Lake City.

Facilities and aircraft 
It has one asphalt paved runway designated 17/35 is 5,781 by 75 feet (1,762 x 23 m). For the 12-month period ending December 31, 2007, the airport had 6,154 aircraft operations, an average of 16 per day: 98% general aviation and 2% air taxi.

References

External links 
 

Airports in Utah
Buildings and structures in San Juan County, Utah
Transportation in San Juan County, Utah